The Goanna tick, (Amblyomma trimaculatum), is a hard-bodied tick of the genus Amblyomma. It is found in Papua New Guinea, Australia, Indonesia, Solomon Islands, and Sri Lanka. It is an ectoparasite of Equus caballus.

References

External links
Biology of Amblyomma integrum Karsch, 1897.
Human otoacariasis: a retrospective study from an area of Sri Lanka

Amblyomma
Animals described in 1878